Agdistopis griveaudi is a moth in the Macropiratidae family. It is known from Madagascar.

References

Macropiratidae
Moths of Madagascar
Moths of Africa